Vinicius para Crianças - Arca de Noé was a Brazilian musical program directed by Ewaldo Ruy and Augusto César Vannucci. It was aired originally on October 10, 1980 on TV Globo.

Production 
The set designer Federico Padilla created ample spaces, set up at the Teatro Fênix, in the Jardim Botânico neighborhood, in Rio de Janeiro, allowing a great movement of musicians and actors on stage.

The stage set also made use of some effects, such as chromakey - a feature that allows the image captured by one camera to be inserted over another, creating the foreground and background impression. Thus it was possible to create a playful atmosphere, reinforcing the poetry of Vinicius de Moraes.

Musical Numbers

Awards

References

External links 
 Official website

1980s Brazilian television series
Brazilian children's television series
1981 Brazilian television series debuts
1981 Brazilian television series endings
Brazilian television miniseries
Brazilian music television series
Rede Globo original programming